Jeff White (born 1957) is American bluegrass guitarist/mandolinist, songwriter, record producer and sound mixer. Jeff White has performed and produced albums with many artists including: Alison Krauss, Vince Gill, The Chieftains, Lyle Lovett, Tim O'Brien, The Travelin' McCourys, Michael Cleveland and The Earls Of Leicester. White won the 57th Annual Grammy Awards,  for Best Bluegrass Album with The Earls of Leicester. One of Jeff's key mentors is award-winning fiddler Michael Cleveland. Jeff and Michael have earned four International Bluegrass Music Awards for Instrumental Recorded Performance of the Year. Jeff produced several of Michael Cleveland's albums. Jeff has toured with banjo picking Earl Scruggs and Louise Scruggs. Jeff White has produced and released four solo albums: in 1996 The White Album, in 1999 The Broken Road, in 2013 Renegade Revelations and in 2016 Right Beside You.

Biography
Jeff White was born in Syracuse, New York; at 13 his family moved to North Manchester, Indiana. Jeff's first interest in bluegrass and country music came from seeing the Hee Haw television show that started in 1971. Jeff started to play guitar in high school and joined the high school bluegrass band, the "Suburban Grass". The band played at schools, coffeehouses and then local bars. In college Jeff discovered his love for bluegrass from a dorm mate that played mandolin. Jeff's dorm mate introduced Jeff to Doc Watson, a pioneer of bluegrass music. Jeff studied Dan Crary, Norman Blake, Don Reno, Bill Monroe, Lester Flatt, Earl Scruggs, Foggy Mountain Boys and The Stanley Brothers. After listening to and learning from the classics, Jeff studied the new bluegrass artists such as Sam Bush and JD Crowe. The next band Jeff joined was The Johnsons. Jeff White and The Johnsons came in 1st place in the Best Bluegrass Band in America contest, put on by KFC in Louisville, Kentucky in 1979. Winning the contest earned them a free recording session in RCA's Nashville studio on Music Row. Tom Collins, an album producer with Real Music City Records, helped them make two singles. In 1981 Jeff White and The Johnsons where named the Best New Bluegrass Band. The Johnsons Band was made up of: Dave Johnson, Dan Anderson, Melody Johnson and Jeff White.  White departed the group and returned to Indiana to attend graduate school. But, Jeff returned to bluegrass and moved to Beanblossom, Indiana, there he joined up with a new and upcoming bluegrass fiddler Alison Krauss. In 1987, Jeff join Alison Krauss band the Union Station. Union Station recorded two albums while he was a member: in 1989 Two Highways and in 1990  I've Got That Old Feeling. A seaside resort in Japan wanted a bluegrass music band, so Jeff joined other bluegrass artists: Scott Vestal, Jeff Autry, Dave Peters, and Gena Britt in 1991 and play for a year. Jeff moved to Nashville in 1992, he played bluegrass at the Station Inn with Tim O'Brien. Jeff broke into professional music when Vince Gill took Jeff on the road with George Jones and Conway Twitty. Vince Gill had Jeff sing When I Call Your Name at the Grand Ole Opry. Vince Gill got Jeff a job playing with Lyle Lovett. Jeff's next job was playing with the traditional Irish band formed in Dublin The Chieftains. Looking to cross Celtic music with bluegrass and country, Paddy Moloney looked to Jeff to help with the new sound. Jeff toured, performed and helped produce the 2002 The Chieftains album Down the Old Plank Road: The Nashville Sessions and in 2003 Further Down the Old Plank Road. Jeff's next project was working with bluegrass fiddle player Michael Cleveland on his albums. Jeff is also a songwriter and has written songs for The Del McCoury Band, Alison Krauss, Dan Tyminski, Dale Ann Bradley, Stringdusters and Dan Tyminski. Jeff sometimes plays guitar with the Nashville bluegrass band The Travelin' McCourys. Jeff currently plays mandolin for The Earls of Leicester, a band that plays tribute to  Flatt and Scruggs. Jeff is married to country music fiddler, guitarist, singer and songwriter, Laura Weber White. Jeff and Laura live in Nashville and were married on March 12, 2017.

Discography

Jeff White's discography:

Albums
Solo Albums

Albums
Albums Jeff has performed on and/or helped produce:

Performances
Selected: Tours, Performances and Events.

Awards
Selected Jeff White Awards:

See also

 List of country musicians
Mandolin playing traditions worldwide

External links

 The Chieftains Official website
youtube.com, Jeff White, "Run Little Rabbit Run", March 24, 2016
Jeff White Video gallery
youtube.com, Jeff White, "I Never Knew", 2012

References

1957 births
American male singer-songwriters
American country singer-songwriters
Living people
21st-century American singers
American mandolinists
21st-century American composers
American bluegrass musicians
Record producers from Tennessee
Production sound mixers
21st-century American male singers
The Earls of Leicester (band) members
Alison Krauss & Union Station members
The Chieftains members
Lyle Lovett and His Large Band members